Nieva is a municipality located in the province of Segovia, Castile and León, Spain, about 32 km (19.8 mi) northwest of the town of Segovia. According to the 2010 census (INE), the municipality has a population of 340 inhabitants.

References

Municipalities in the Province of Segovia